The Saint-Georges river is a tributary of the south shore of the Chêne River which flows on the south shore of the St. Lawrence River. The Saint-Georges river flows in the municipality of Sainte-Agathe-de-Lotbinière, in Lotbinière Regional County Municipality, in the administrative region of Chaudière-Appalaches, in Quebec, in Canada.

Geography 
The main watersheds neighboring the Saint-Georges River are:
 north side: rivière du Chêne;
 east side: Armagh River, Filkars River;
 south side: rivière aux Chevreuils, Palmer River, Bécancour River;
 west side: rivière du Chêne, Henri River.

The Saint-Georges river has its source on the east side of the village of Sainte-Agathe-de-Lotbinière. This head area is located north of the Bécancour River, in the Sainte-Agathe falls area.

Toponymy 
The toponym Rivière Saint-Georges was formalized on August 8, 1977, at the Commission de toponymie du Québec.

See also 

 List of rivers of Quebec

References 

Rivers of Chaudière-Appalaches
Lotbinière Regional County Municipality
L'Érable Regional County Municipality